Posyolok otdeleniya 2 sovkhoza Volgo-Don is a rural locality (a settlement) in Bereslavskoye Rural Settlement, Kalachyovsky District, Volgograd Oblast, Russia. The population was 510 as of 2010. There are 3 streets.

Geography 
The settlement is located on south bank of the Volga–Don Canal, 36 km east of Kalach-na-Donu (the district's administrative centre) by road. Karpovka is the nearest rural locality.

References 

Rural localities in Kalachyovsky District